Benxi is a prefecture-level city located in the east of Liaoning province, People's Republic of China, south-southeast of the provincial capital Shenyang. As of the 2020 census, its population was 1,326,018 (1,709,538 in 2010) whom 809,655 lived in the built-up area made of 3 urban districts (Pingshan, Xihu and Mingshan). It was founded as a metallurgical center in 1915. Benxi Iron and Steel Company (Bengang) is the largest employer in the city, and used to be the fourth-largest steel company in China. The second-largest industry in Benxi is coal mining. The city has pollution problems due to steel production and coal mining.

During the disaster of Air France flight AF447, Benxi Iron and Steel Company lost 5 employees, including the executive Chen Chiping who was the wife of Liaoning's provincial governor.

History
As early as 400,000 years ago, there were people living in Benxi prefecture, which was indicated by Miaohou Mountain ruins with human fossils and stone tools explored in this region.

The worst coal mining disaster in the world took place on April 26, 1942 in Benxihu Colliery. A coal-dust explosion killed 1,549 miners working that day, making it the worst disaster in the history of coal mining and the second worst recorded industrial accident. The explosion sent flames bursting out of the mine shaft entrance. Miners' relatives rushed to the site but were denied entry by a cordon of Japanese guards who erected electric fences to keep them out. In an attempt to curtail the fire underground, the Japanese shut off the ventilation and sealed the pit head. Witnesses say that the Japanese did not evacuate the pit fully before sealing it, trapping many Chinese workers underground to suffocate in the smoke.

The city is home to a notable number of Manchu and Hui people.

Administrative divisions
Benxi contains 4 districts and 2 autonomous counties:

Within these there are 25 counties, 40 villages and towns, 229 communities and 289 village committees.

Geography
It is bordered by Tonghua (Jilin) to the east, Dandong to the south, Liaoyang to the west, Shenyang to the northwest, and Fushun to the north. The area has many mountains as well as a high degree of forest coverage (74%).

Climate

Benxi has a monsoon-influenced humid continental climate (Köppen Dwa), characterised by hot, humid summers, due to the East Asian monsoon, and long, cold and windy, but dry winters, due to the Siberian anticyclone. The four seasons here are distinctive. Nearly half of the annual rainfall occurs in July and August alone. With monthly percent possible sunshine ranging from 38% in July to 63% in February, the city receives 2,325 hours of bright sunshine annually.

Economy
Benxi's economy grew 10% in 2012 to a regional GDP of 111.24 billion CNY. Ranked eighth out of fourteen prefecture level cities in Liaoning, the city's GDP accounted for approximately 4% of provincial total. Urban per-capita disposable income was 22,466 CNY, and consumption per capita 16,064 CNY.

With 46 large and medium-sized enterprises in Benxi, main industrial products are raw iron (14 million tons), steel (13 million tons), finished steel (12 million tons), cement (3 million tons) and raw coal (1 million tons). In 2008, 92,615 people were employed in manufacturing, 20,368 in education, 19,228 in public administration and social organizations, 17,913 persons in the mining industry, and 12,997 in transportation and storage. According to the type of business ownership, 63,000 were employed in private companies.

Uranium is mined in the region.

As of 2009, Asia's biggest iron ore mine, which is reported to possess more than 3 billion tons of proven reserves, has been found in this region.

Education

The city contains the Benxi Campus of the Liaoning University of Traditional Chinese Medicine (LNUTCM).

In the perspective of high school education, the Benxi Senior High School (Benxi Gaozhong) is located in the city, while the school faced severe controversy on the unreasonably-high number of Sporting Students. However, the currency of the school is improving with the former-principal Pang Mingrong dismissed from the school, Pang was infamous and controversial for the injustice in his attitude towards students of different 'classes,' which builds on test scores, however revered by his students.

Tourist activities

Benxi is rich with tourist attractions. The eastern side of the prefecture is covered with mountains, caves and lakes with low population, making the various parks in that area popular.

The Benxi Lake, located at the urban area of Xihu district in Benxi, after which the city was named in Qing dynasty, is the tiniest lake in the world. With an area less than 15 sq. meters and a daily rate of flow at approximately 20,000 tons, the lake acts as a famous tourist attraction of the city.

The Benxi Water Cave National Park is a subterranean river, some 3,000 meters long, 2 meters deep and wide enough for 20-30 boats. The cave is filled with countless stalactites and stone flowers, pillars and curtains.

Wunü Mountain National Park is an area of natural beauty. The park also contains the remains of an ancient Goguryeo capital city. As such the site has been recognised as a UNESCO World Heritage Site.

Guanmenshan National Forest Park is a valley of outstanding natural beauty. Secluded trails run up and down the valley. The area is particularly popular in autumn when the leaves of the many maple trees that line the valley turn bright red.

Pictures

Sister cities
 Peoria, Illinois, United States
 Brampton, Ontario, Canada
Modena, Italy

References

External links

 Benxi Municipal People's Government official website
 Benxi Man Autonomous County official website

 
Cities in Liaoning
Prefecture-level divisions of Liaoning